The 1973 oil crisis or first oil crisis began in October 1973 when the members of the Organization of Arab Petroleum Exporting Countries (OAPEC), led by King Faisal of Saudi Arabia, proclaimed an oil embargo. The embargo was targeted at nations that had supported Israel during the Yom Kippur War. The initial nations targeted were Canada, Japan, the Netherlands, the United Kingdom and the United States, though the embargo also later extended to Portugal, Rhodesia and South Africa.
By the end of the embargo in March 1974, the price of oil had risen nearly 300%, from US to nearly  globally; US prices were significantly higher. The embargo caused an oil crisis, or "shock", with many short- and long-term effects on global politics and the global economy. It was later called the "first oil shock", followed by the 1979 oil crisis, termed the "second oil shock".

Background

Arab-Israeli conflict
Ever since Israel declared independence in 1948 there was conflict between Arabs and Israelis in the Middle East, including several wars. The Suez Crisis, also known as the Second Arab–Israeli war, was sparked by Israel's southern port of Eilat being blocked by Egypt, which also nationalized the Suez Canal belonging to French and British investors. As a result of the war, the Suez Canal was closed for several months between 1956 and 1957. 

The Six-Day War of 1967 included an Israeli invasion of the Egyptian Sinai Peninsula, which resulted in Egypt closing the Suez Canal for eight years. Following the Yom Kippur War, the canal was cleared in 1974 and opened again in 1975. OAPEC countries cut production of oil and placed an embargo on oil exports to the United States after Richard Nixon requested $2.2 billion to support Israel's war effort. Nevertheless, the embargo lasted only until January 1974, though the price of oil remained high afterwards.

American production decline
By 1969, American domestic output of oil was peaking and could not keep pace with increasing demand from vehicles. Because of transportation costs and tariffs, it never purchased much oil from the Middle East. In 1973, US production had declined to 16% of global output. Eisenhower imposed quotas on foreign oil that would stay in place between 1959 and 1973. Critics called it the "drain America first" policy. Some scholars believe the policy contributed to the decline of domestic US oil production in the early 1970s.

When Richard Nixon became president in 1969, he assigned George Shultz to head a committee to review the Eisenhower-era quota program. Shultz's committee recommended that the quotas be abolished and replaced with tariffs but Nixon decided to keep the quotas due to vigorous political opposition. Nixon imposed a price ceiling on oil in 1971 as demand for oil was increasing and production was declining, which increased dependence on foreign oil imports as consumption was bolstered by low prices. In 1973, Nixon announced the end of the quota system. Between 1970 and 1973 US imports of crude oil had nearly doubled, reaching 6.2 million barrels per day in 1973. Until 1973, an abundance of oil supply had kept the market price of oil lower than the posted price.

In 1970, American oil production peaked and the United States began to import more and more oil as oil imports rose by 52% between 1969 and 1972. By 1972, 83% of the American oil imports came from the Middle East. Throughout the 1960s, the price for a barrel of oil remained at $1.80, meaning that with the effects of inflation considered the price of oil in real terms got progressively lower and lower throughout the decade with Americans paying less for oil in 1969 than they had in 1959. Even after a price for a barrel of oil rose to $2.00 in 1971, adjusted for inflation, people in the Western nations were paying less for oil in 1971 than they had in 1958. The extremely low price of oil served as the basis for the "long summer" of prosperity and mass affluence that began in 1945.

OPEC
The Organization of the Petroleum Exporting Countries (OPEC), was founded by five oil producing countries at a Baghdad conference on September 14, 1960. The five founding members of OPEC were Venezuela, Iraq, Saudi Arabia, Iran and Kuwait. OPEC was organized after the oil companies slashed the posted price of oil, but the posted price of oil remained consistently higher than the market price of oil between 1961 and 1972.

In 1963, the Seven Sisters controlled 86% of the oil produced by OPEC countries, but by 1970 the rise of "independent oil companies" had decreased their share to 77%. The entry of three new oil producers—Algeria, Libya and Nigeria—meant that by 1970, 81 oil companies were doing business in the Middle East.

In the early 1960s Libya, Indonesia and Qatar joined OPEC. OPEC was generally regarded as ineffective until political turbulence in Libya and Iraq strengthened their position in 1970. Additionally, increasing Soviet influence provided oil producing countries with alternative means of transporting oil to markets.

Under the Tehran Price Agreement of 1971, the posted price of oil was increased and, due to a decline in the value of the US dollar relative to gold, certain anti-inflationary measures were enacted.

In September 1973, President Nixon said, "Oil without a market, as Mr. Mossadegh learned many, many years ago, does not do a country much good", referring to the 1951 nationalization of the Iranian oil industry, but between October 1973 and February 1974 the OPEC countries raised by posted price fourfold to nearly $12.

Because oil was priced in dollars, oil producers' real income decreased when the dollar started to float free of the old link to gold. In September 1971, OPEC issued a joint communiqué stating that from then on, they would price oil in terms of a fixed amount of gold.

This contributed to the "oil shock". After 1971, OPEC was slow to readjust prices to reflect this depreciation. From 1947 to 1967, the dollar price of oil had risen by less than two percent per year. Until the oil shock, the price had also remained fairly stable versus other currencies and commodities. OPEC ministers had not developed institutional mechanisms to update prices in sync with changing market conditions, so their real incomes lagged. The substantial price increases of 1973–1974 largely returned their prices and corresponding incomes to Bretton Woods levels in terms of commodities such as gold.

The "oil weapon"
Arab oil producing countries had attempted to use oil as leverage to influence political events on two prior occasions—the first was the Suez Crisis in 1956 when the United Kingdom, France and Israel invaded Egypt. During the conflict the Syrians sabotaged both the Trans-Arabian Pipeline and the Iraq–Baniyas pipeline, which disrupted the supply of oil to Western Europe. The second instance was when war broke out between Egypt and Israel in 1967, but despite continued Egyptian and Syrian enmity against Israel, the embargo lasted only a few months. Most scholars agree that the 1967 embargo was ineffective.

Although some members of the Organization of Arab Petroleum Exporting Countries (OAPEC) supported the use of oil as a weapon to influence the political outcome of the Arab–Israeli conflict, Saudi Arabia had traditionally been the strongest supporter of separating oil from politics. The Saudis were wary of the tactic due to the availability of oil from non-Arab oil producing countries, and in the decades leading up to the crisis, the region's conservative monarchies had grown dependent on Western support to ensure their continued survival as Nasserism gained traction. On the other hand, Algeria, Iraq and Libya had strongly supported the use of oil as a weapon in the conflict. Arab newspapers like the Egyptian Al-Ahram, Lebanese An-Nahar and Iraqi Al-Thawra had historically been supportive of the use of oil as a weapon.

In 1970, President Nasser of Egypt died and was succeeded by Anwar Sadat, a man who believed in the diplomacy of surprise, in engaging in sudden moves to upset the diplomatic equilibrium. Sadat liked to say that his favourite game was backgammon, a game where skill and persistence was rewarded, but was best won by sudden gambles, making an analogy between how he played backgammon and conducted his diplomacy. Under Nasser, Egypt and Saudi Arabia had engaged what was known as the Arab Cold War, but Sadat got along very well with King Faisal of Saudi Arabia, forming an alliance between the most populous Arab state and the wealthiest Arab state. Unlike the secularist Nasser, Sadat was a pious Muslim and he had a strong personal rapport with King Faisal, who was an equally pious Muslim. The man largely in charge of American foreign policy, the National Security Adviser, Henry Kissinger, later admitted that he was engrossed with the Paris peace talks to end Vietnam war that he and others in Washington missed the significance of the Egyptian-Saudi alliance. At the same time that Sadat moved closer to Saudi Arabia, he also wanted a rapprochement with the United States and to move Egypt away from its alliance with the Soviet Union. In 1971, the US had information that the Arab states were willing to implement another embargo. In July 1972, Sadat expelled all 16,000 of the Soviet military personnel in Egypt in a signal that he wanted better relations with the United States. Kissinger was taken completely by surprise by Sadat's move, saying: "Why has he done me this favor? Why didn't he demand all sorts of concessions first?"

Sadat expected as a reward that the United States would respond by pressuring Israel to return the Sinai to Egypt, but after his anti-Soviet move prompted no response from the United States, by November 1972 Sadat moved again closer to the Soviet Union, buying a massive amount of Soviet arms for a war he planned to launch against Israel in 1973. For Sadat, cost was no object as the money to buy Soviet arms came from Saudi Arabia. At the same time, Faisal promised Sadat that if it should come to war, Saudi Arabia would embargo oil to the West. In April 1973, the Saudi Oil Minister Ahmed Zaki Yamani visited Washington to meet Kissinger and told him that King Faisal was becoming more and more unhappy with the United States, saying he wanted America to pressure Israel to return all the lands captured in the Six Day War of 1967. 

In a later interview, Yamani accused Kissinger of not taking his warning seriously, saying all he did was to ask him not to speak anymore of this threat. Angry at Kissinger, Yamani in an interview with the Washington Post on 19 April 1973 warned that King Faisal was considering an oil embargo. At the time, the general feeling in Washington was the Saudis were bluffing and nothing would come of their threat to impose an oil embargo. The fact that Faisal's ineffectual half brother King Saud had imposed a cripplingly oil embargo on Britain and France during the Suez War of 1956 was not considered an important precedent. The CEOs of four of America's oil companies had after speaking to Faisal arrived in Washington in May 1973 with the warning that Faisal was considerably more tougher, intelligent and ruthless than his half-brother Saud whom he had deposed in 1964, and his threats were serious. Kissinger declined to meet the four CEOs.
In an assessment done by Kissinger and his staff about the Middle East in the summer of 1973, the repeated statements by Sadat about waging  jihad against Israel were dismissed as empty talk while the warnings from King Faisal were likewise regarded as inconsequential. In September 1973, Nixon fired Rogers as Secretary of State and replaced him with Kissinger. Kissinger was later to state he had not been given enough time to know the Middle East as he settled into the State Department's office at Foggy Bottom as Egypt and Syria attacked Israel on 6 October 1973.

On October 6, 1973, Egypt attacked the Bar Lev Line in the Sinai Peninsula and Syria launched an offensive in the Golan Heights, both of which had been occupied by Israel during the 1967 Six-Day War. Kissinger promised the Israeli Prime Minister Golda Meir the United States would replace its losses in equipment after the war, but sought initially to delay arm shipments to Israel as he believed it would improve the odds of making peace along the lines of United Nations Security Council Resolution 242 calling for a "land for peace" deal if an armistice was signed with Egypt and Syria gaining some territory in the Sinai and the Golan Heights respectively. The Arab concept of the "peace of the brave" (i.e. a victorious leader being magnanimous to his defeated opponents) meant there was a possibility that Sadat at least would make peace with Israel provided that the war ended in such a way that Egypt was not perceived to be defeated. Likewise, Kissinger regarded Meir as being rather arrogant and believed that an armistice that ended the war in a manner that was not an unambiguous Israeli victory would make her more humble.

As both Syria and Egypt lost much equipment during the fighting, the Soviet Union began to fly new equipment in starting on 12 October, and the Soviet flights to Syria and Egypt were recorded by the British radar stations in Cyprus. Though the Soviets were flying in an average of 60 flights per day, exaggerated accounts appeared in Western newspapers speaking of "one hundred flights per day". At this point, both Nixon and Kissinger began to see the October War more in terms of the Cold War rather than Middle Eastern politics, both seeing the Soviet arms lifts to Egypt and Syria as a Soviet power play that required an American answer. On October 12, 1973, US president Richard Nixon authorized Operation Nickel Grass, a strategic airlift to deliver weapons and supplies to Israel in order to replace its materiel losses, after the Soviet Union began sending arms to Syria and Egypt. 

On October 17, Arab oil producers cut production by 5% and instituted an oil embargo against Israel's allies: the United States, the Netherlands, Rhodesia, South Africa, and Portugal. On 17–19 October 1973, the Saudi Foreign Minister, Omar Saqqaf, visited Washington together with the foreign ministers of Algeria, Kuwait and Morocco to warn that there was a real possibility of an oil embargo being imposed. During a press conference, an American reporter mocked the threat, contemptuously saying the Saudis "could drink their oil", leading Saqqaf to reply in anger "All right, we will!". Saqqaf met with Nixon in the Oval Office who promised him that the United States would mediate a settlement to the war that would be "peaceful, just and honorable" to both sides. Saqqaf reported to King Faisal that Nixon told him that he ended the Vietnam war on an honorable basis and now intended to end the October war in the same manner.

Israel took heavy losses in men and material during the fighting against Egypt and Syria, and on 18 October 1973 Meir requested $850 million worth of American arms and equipment to replace its material losses. Nixon decided characteristically to act on an epic scale and instead of the $850 million worth of arms requested sent a request to Congress for some $2.2 billion worth of arms to Israel, which was promptly approved. Nixon later boasted in his memoirs that the U.S. Air Force flew more sorties to Israel in October 1973 than it had during the Berlin Airlift of 1948–49, flying in a gargantuan quantity of arms, though he also admitted that by the time the arms lift had begun, the Israelis had already "turned the tide of battle" in their favor, making the arms lift irrelevant to the outcome of the war. In an interview with the British historian Robert Lacey in 1981, Kissinger later admitted about the arms lift to Israel: "I made a mistake. In retrospect it was not the best considered decision we made". 

The arms lift enraged King Faisal of Saudi Arabia and he retaliated on 20 October 1973 by placing a total embargo on oil shipments to the United States, to be joined by all of the other oil-producing Arab states except Iraq and Libya. Faisal was angry that Israel had only asked for $850 million worth of American weapons, and instead received an unsolicited $2.2 billion worth of weapons, which he perceived as a sign of the pro-Israeli slant of American foreign policy. Faisal also felt insulted that Nixon had just promised Saqqaf a "honorable" peace the day before he submitted the request to Congress for some $2.2 billion worth of arms for Israel, which he saw as an act of duplicity on Nixon's part. Faisal had been opposed to a total embargo and only agreed to the 5% cut on 17 October under pressure from other Arab states. Faisal felt his efforts on behalf the United States were not being appreciated in Washington, which increased his fury at Nixon.

Saudi Arabia only consented to the embargo after Nixon's promise of $2.2 billion in military aid to Israel. On the afternoon of 19 October 1973, Faisal was in his office when he learned about the United States sending $2.2 billion worth of weapons to Israel, and discussed the issue with two of his closest advisers, Abdullah ibn Abdul Rahman and Rashad Pharaon. The king called Yamani at about 8 pm, and told him he was needed at the Riyassa Palace immediately. Yamani told the king: "The TV news goes out at nine. If you make a decision now, we can get it announced at once". The king replied "Write this down" and announced he was placing a total embargo on the United States.

The embargo was accompanied by gradual monthly production cuts—by December, production had been cut to 25% of September levels. This contributed to a global recession and increased tension between the United States and several of its European allies, who faulted the US for provoking an embargo by providing what many viewed as unconditional assistance to Israel. OAPEC demanded a complete Israeli withdrawal from all territories beyond the 1949 Armistice border.

Effectiveness of embargo
The embargo lasted from October 1973 to March 1974. During a summit in Cairo on 6 November, Kissinger asked Sadat what Faisal was like and was told: "Well, Dr. Henry, he will probably go on with you about Communism and the Jews". King Faisal's two great hatreds were Communism and Zionism as he believed that the Soviet Union and Israel were plotting together against Islam. When King Faisal was shown a translation into Arabic of The Protocols of the Learned Elders of Zion, he instantly believed in the authenticity of The Protocols and therefore talked to anyone who would listen about what he had learned, despite the fact that The Protocols had been exposed as a forgery in 1921.

On 7 November 1973, Kissinger flew to Riyadh to meet King Faisal and ask him to end the oil embargo in exchange for promising to be "evenhanded" with the Arab-Israeli dispute. As the plane carrying him prepared to land in Riyadh, Kissinger was clearly nervous at the prospect of negotiating with the stern Wahhabi Faisal who had a marked dislike of Jews. Kissinger discovered that King Faisal was a worthy companion to Lê Đức Thọ in terms of stubbornness as the king accused the United States of being biased in favor of Israel, going on in a long rant about the balefulness of "Jewish Communists" in Russia and Israel, and despite all of Kissinger's efforts to charm him, refused to end the oil embargo. Faisal told Kissinger: "The United States used to stand up to aggression-you did that in World War Two and in 1956 during the Suez War. If the United States had done the same after 1967, we would not have witnessed the this deterioration... Before the Jewish State was established, there existed nothing to harm good relations between Arabs and Jews. There were many Jews in Arab countries. When the Jews were persecuted in Spain, Arabs protected them. When the Romans drove the Jews out, Arabs protected them. At Yalta, it was Stalin who said there had to be a Jewish state...Israel is advancing Communist objectives...Among those of the Jewish faith there are those who embrace Zionism...Most of the immigration to Israel is from the Soviet Union...They want to establish a Communist base right in the Middle East...And now, all over the world, the Jews are putting themselves into positions of authority". On 22 February 1974, King Faisal chaired the second summit of Islamic states in Islamabad (which unlike the first summit Faisal had chaired in 1969 was not boycotted by Iraq and Syria), where he was acclaimed as a conquering hero who humiliated and humbled the West by wrecking its economy. The prime minister of Pakistan, Zulfikar Ali Bhutto, opened the conference by stating: "The armies of Pakistan are the armies of Islam. We shall enter Jerusalem as brothers-in-arms!"

Only on 19 March 1974 did the king end the oil embargo after Sadat, whom he trusted, reported to him that the United States was being more "evenhanded" and after Kissinger had promised to sell Saudi Arabia weapons that it had previously denied under the grounds that they might be used against Israel. More importantly, Saudi Arabia had billions of dollars invested in Western banks, and the massive bout of inflation set off by the oil embargo was a threat to this fortune as inflation eroded the value of the money, giving Faisal a vested interest in helping to contain the damage he himself inflicted on the economies of the West.

Since Israeli forces did not withdraw to the 1949 Armistice Line, the majority of scholars believe that the embargo was a failure. Roy Licklieder, in his 1988 book Political Power and the Arab Oil Weapon, concluded that the embargo was a failure because the countries that were targeted by the embargo did not change their policies on the Arab–Israeli conflict. Licklieder believed that any long term changes were caused by the OPEC increase in the posted price of oil, and not the OAPEC embargo. Daniel Yergin, on the other hand, has said that the embargo "remade the international economy". Lacey wrote: "King Faisal's momentous oil embargo of 20 October 1973 did not achieve a single one of its stated objectives. The ceasefire which the USA and the USSR together imposed two days later upon Israel, Syria and Egypt would have been imposed in any case; Israel ended the October war, thanks to US aid, better equipped militarily than she had ever been before, and Faisal's ambition to shrink Israel back inside her pre-1949 boundaries remains unfulfilled to this day. Nor did the withholding of the 638, 500 barrels of oil which the Saudi Arabia had been selling to America every day for the first 10 months of 1973 ever come, in itself, to jeopardizing the power or diverting the policies of the United States, since it accounted for less than 4 percent of America's daily 17 million barrel consumption. It was the interaction which Faisal's embargo had with other forces that made it so decisive. Arab politics had an immediate multiplier effect. 'If Saudi Arabia moves from A to B', remarked a Beirut oil consultant in 1974, 'every other oil producer must move at least as far, if not to C'".

Because every Arab state except for Iraq and Libya joined the oil embargo, oil exports from the Middle East to the West were down by 60%-70% by November 1973. Japan and the nations of western Europe imported some 75% of their oil from the Near East, and the embargo led to immediate and sharp price raises as Lacey noted that "competing desperately for dwindling supplies, consumers showed themselves willing to pay unparalleled money for their oil". When the Iranian state oil company held an auction on 16 December 1973, bids for some $17 US dollars per barrel of oil were made. In late December 1973, OPEC held a conference in Vienna when it was announced the price for a barrel of oil was to from $5 US dollars per barrel to $11.65 US dollars per barrel. Faisal was opposed to the price increase, which was largely the work of the Iranian delegation.

Over the long term, the oil embargo changed the nature of policy in the West towards increased exploration, alternative energy research, energy conservation and more restrictive monetary policy to better fight inflation.

Chronology

For further details see the "Energy crisis" series by Facts on File.
January 1973The 1973–1974 stock market crash commences as a result of inflation pressure and the collapsing monetary system.
August 23, 1973In preparation for the Yom Kippur War, Saudi King Faisal and Egyptian president Anwar Sadat meet in Riyadh and secretly negotiate an accord whereby the Arabs will use the "oil weapon" as part of the military conflict.
October 6Egypt and Syria attack Israeli positions on Yom Kippur, starting the 1973 Arab–Israeli War.
Night of October 8Israel goes on full nuclear alert. Kissinger is notified on the morning of October 9. United States begins to resupply Israel.
October 8–10OPEC negotiations with major oil companies to revise the 1971 Tehran price agreement fail.
October 12The United States initiates Operation Nickel Grass, a strategic airlift to provide replacement weapons and supplies to Israel. This followed similar Soviet moves to supply the Arab side.
October 16Saudi Arabia, Iran, Iraq, Abu Dhabi, Kuwait and Qatar raise posted prices by 17% to $3.65 per barrel and announce production cuts.
October 17OAPEC oil ministers agree to use oil to influence the West's support of Israel. They recommended an embargo against non-complying states and mandated export cuts.
October 19Nixon requests Congress to appropriate $2.2 billion in emergency aid to Israel, which triggers a collective Arab response. Libya immediately proclaims an embargo on oil exports to the US. Saudi Arabia and other Arab oil-producing states follow the next day.
October 26The Yom Kippur War ends.
November 5Arab producers announce a 25% output cut. A further 5% cut is threatened.
November 23The Arab embargo is extended to Portugal, Rhodesia and South Africa.
November 27Nixon signs the Emergency Petroleum Allocation Act authorizing price, production, allocation and marketing controls.
December 9Arab oil ministers agree to another five percent production cut for non-friendly countries in January 1974.
December 25Arab oil ministers cancel the January output cut. Saudi oil minister Ahmed Zaki Yamani promises a ten percent OPEC production rise.
January 7–9, 1974OPEC decides to freeze prices until April 1.
January 18Israel signs a withdrawal agreement to pull back to the east side of the Suez Canal.
February 11Kissinger unveils the Project Independence plan for US energy independence.
February 12–14Progress in Arab-Israeli disengagement triggers discussion of oil strategy among the heads of state of Algeria, Egypt, Syria and Saudi Arabia.
March 5Israel withdraws the last of its troops from the west side of the Suez Canal.
March 17Arab oil ministers, with the exception of Libya, announce the end of the US embargo.
May 31Diplomacy by Kissinger produces a disengagement agreement on the Syrian front.
December 1974The U.S. stock market recovers.

Effects

The effects of the embargo were immediate. OPEC forced oil companies to increase payments drastically. The price of oil quadrupled by 1974 from US$3 to nearly US$12 per 42 gallon barrel ($75 per cubic meter), equivalent in 2018 dollars to a price rise from $ to $ per barrel.

The crisis eased when the embargo was lifted in March 1974 after negotiations at the Washington Oil Summit, but the effects lingered throughout the 1970s. The dollar price of energy increased again the following year, amid the weakening competitive position of the dollar in world markets.

The Arab oil embargo ended the long period of prosperity in the West that had begun in 1945, throwing the world's economy into the steepest economic contraction since the Great Depression. Lacey wrote about the impact of the Arab oil embargo of 1973–74 that for people in the West life suddenly become "slower, darker and chiller" as gasoline was rationed, the lights were turned off in Times Square, the "gas guzzler" automobiles stopped selling, speed limits became common and restrictions were placed on weekend driving in a bid to conserve fuel. As the American automobile industry specialized in producing heavy "gas guzzler" vehicles, there was an immediate shift on the part of consumers to the lighter and more fuel efficient vehicles produced by the Japanese and West German automobile industries, sending the American automobile industry into decline. The years from 1945 to 1973 had been a period of unprecedented prosperity in the West, a "long summer" that many believed would never end, and its abrupt end in 1973 as the oil embargo which increased the price of oil by 400% within a matter of days threw the world's economy into a sharp recession with unemployment mounting and inflation raging came as a profound shock. The end of what the French called the Trente Glorieuses ("Glorious Thirty") led to a mood of widespread pessimism in the West with the Financial Times running a famous headline in late 1973 saying "The Future will be subject to Delay".

Impact on oil exporting nations
This price increase had a dramatic effect on oil exporting nations, for the countries of the Middle East who had long been dominated by the industrial powers were seen to have taken control of a vital commodity. The oil-exporting nations began to accumulate vast wealth.

Some of the income was dispensed in the form of aid to other underdeveloped nations whose economies had been caught between higher oil prices and lower prices for their own export commodities, amid shrinking Western demand. Much went for arms purchases that exacerbated political tensions, particularly in the Middle East. Saudi Arabia spent over 100 billion dollars in the ensuing decades for helping spread its fundamentalist interpretation of Islam, known as Wahhabism, throughout the world, via religious charities such as the al-Haramain Foundation, which often also distributed funds to violent Sunni extremist groups such as Al-Qaeda and the Taliban.

The oil embargo led a sudden interest in the Palestinian issue. On 8 November 1973, Kissinger became the first Secretary of State to meet with a Saudi leader since 1953 as he met King Faisal to ask him to end the embargo. Within two week of the embargo being launched, all of the foreign ministers of the nations of the European Economic Community (now the European Union) met in a conference to issue a statement calling for Israel "to end the territorial occupation which has maintained since the conflict of 1967". On 11 December 1973, the Japanese Foreign Minister Masayoshi Ōhira flew in to Riyadh to meet King Faisal for "talks on improving bilateral relations". Shortly afterwards, the French foreign minister Michel Jobert arrived to sign an agreement that provided oil for France for the next twenty years. On 24 January 1974, as the Shah of Iran, Mohammad Reza Pahlavi, was coming off the ski slopes of St. Moritz, he was met by the British Chancellor of Exchequer, Anthony Barber, and the Trade Secretary, Peter Walker. In a role-reversal, Barber and Walker paid homage to the Shah, who promised them that his nation would sell the United Kingdom 5 million tons of oil in exchange for some £100 million of British goods to aid his plans to industrialize Iran.

OPEC-member states raised the prospect of nationalization of oil company holdings. Most notably, Saudi Arabia nationalized Aramco in 1980 under the leadership of Saudi oil minister Ahmed Zaki Yamani. As other OPEC nations followed suit, the cartel's income soared. Saudi Arabia undertook a series of ambitious five-year development plans. The biggest began in 1980, funded at $250 billion. Other cartel members also undertook major economic development programs.

Oil weapon
Control of oil became known as the "oil weapon". It came in the form of an embargo and production cutbacks from the Arab states. The weapon was aimed at the United States, Great Britain, Canada, Japan and the Netherlands. These target governments perceived that the intent was to push them towards a more pro-Arab position. Production was eventually cut by 25%. However, the affected countries did not undertake dramatic policy changes.

The risk that the Middle East could become another superpower confrontation with the USSR was of more concern to Washington than oil. Further, interest groups and government agencies more worried about energy were no match for Kissinger's dominance.

Impact on United States 

In the US production, distribution and price disruptions "have been held responsible for recessions, periods of excessive inflation, reduced productivity, and lower economic growth." Some researchers regard the 1973 "oil price shock" and the accompanying 1973–74 stock market crash as the first discrete event since the Great Depression to have a persistent effect on the US economy.

The embargo had a negative influence on the US economy by causing immediate demands to address the threats to U.S. energy security. On an international level, the price increases changed competitive positions in many industries, such as automobiles. Macroeconomic problems consisted of both inflationary and deflationary impacts. The embargo left oil companies searching for new ways to increase oil supplies, even in rugged terrain such as the Arctic. Finding oil and developing new fields usually required five to 10 years before significant production.

The average US retail price of a gallon of regular gasoline rose 43% from 38.5¢ in May 1973 to 55.1¢ in June 1974. State governments asked citizens not to put up Christmas lights. Oregon banned Christmas and commercial lighting altogether. Politicians called for a national gasoline rationing program. Nixon asked gasoline retailers to voluntarily not sell gasoline on Saturday nights or Sundays; 90% of gas station owners complied, which produced long lines of motorists wanting to fill up their cars while they still could.

Impact on Western Europe
The embargo was not uniform across Western Europe. The UK, Germany, Italy, Switzerland and Norway banned flying, driving and boating on Sundays. Sweden rationed gasoline and heating oil. The Netherlands imposed prison sentences for those who used more than their ration of electricity. 
Of the nine members of the European Economic Community (EEC), the Netherlands faced a complete embargo. By contrast Britain and France received almost uninterrupted supplies. That was their reward for refusing to allow the US to use their airfields and stopping arms and supplies to both the Arabs and the Israelis. The other six EEC nations faced partial cutbacks. The UK had traditionally been an ally of Israel, and Harold Wilson's government supported the Israelis during the Six-Day War. His successor, Ted Heath, reversed this policy in 1970, calling for Israel to withdraw to its pre-1967 borders.

The EEC was unable to achieve a common policy during the first month of the embargo. It issued a statement on November 6, after the embargo and price rises had begun. It was widely viewed as pro-Arab, supporting the Franco-British line on the war. OPEC duly lifted its embargo from all EEC members. The price rises had a much greater impact in Europe than the embargo.

Impact on United Kingdom
Despite facing little direct effect from the embargo, the UK nonetheless faced an energy crisis of its own—a series of strikes by coal miners and railroad workers over the winter of 1973–74 became a major factor in the defeat of Edward Heath's Conservative government in February 1974 general elections. The new Labour government told the British to heat only one room in their houses over the winter.

Impact on Japan
Japan was hard hit since it imported 90% of its oil from the Middle East. It had a stockpile good for 55 days, and another 20-day supply was en route. Facing its most serious crisis since 1945 the government ordered a 10% cut in the consumption of industrial oil and electricity. In December it ordered an immediate 20% cut in oil use and electric power to Japan's major industries, and cutbacks in leisure automobile usage. Economist predicted the growth rate would plunge from 5% annually down to zero or even negative territory. Inflation hit 9%. Seeking to take advantage of the crisis, Japanese business called on the government to relax its controls on air pollution and water pollution. The government refused. Moscow tried to take advantage by promising energy assistance if Japan returned the Kurile Islands. Tokyo refused. Instead it made $3.3 billion of dollars in loans to the Arab states and called on Israel to step back. Japan's defensive strategy was explained to Kissinger when he met with top leaders in Tokyo in November 1973. In the long run Japan never wavered in its determination to maintain very strong close ties to the United States, while in self-defense briefly providing the Arab powers with the rhetoric they demanded in return for resuming oil shipments in early 1974.

To assure future oil flows, Japan added suppliers outside of the Middle East; invested in nuclear power; imposed conservation measures; and provided funding for Arab governments and the Palestinians. The crisis was a major factor in the long-run shift of Japan's economy away from oil-intensive industries. Investment shifted to electronics. Japanese auto makers also benefited from the crisis. The jump in gasoline prices helped their small, fuel-efficient models to gain market share from the "gas-guzzling" Detroit competition. This triggered a drop in American sales of American brands that lasted into the 1980s.

Impact on South Vietnam
The oil shock destroyed the economy of South Vietnam. A spokesman for Nguyễn Văn Thiệu admitted in a TV interview that the government was being "overwhelmed" by the inflation caused by the oil shock, while an American businessman living in Saigon stated after the oil shock that attempting to make money in South Vietnam was "like making love to a corpse". In December 1973, Vietcong sappers attacked and destroyed the petroleum depot of Nha Be, further depleting fuel sources. By the summer of 1974, the U.S. embassy in Saigon reported that morale in the ARVN (Army of the Republic of Vietnam) had fallen to dangerously low levels and it was uncertain how much more longer South Vietnam would last. As inflation eroded the value of the South Vietnamese đồng, it became common by the summer of 1974 to see ARVN soldiers and their families begging in the streets for food. In December 1974, the North Vietnamese PAVN (People's Army of Vietnam) launched an offensive in the Central Highlands, which far more successful than expected as the ARVN, which was suffering from low morale, put up a feeble resistance. On 1 March 1975, the PAVN launched a major offensive that saw them quickly overrun the Central Highlands, by 25 March, Hue had fallen. Following their victory in the Central Highlands, the North Vietnamese launched the "Ho Chi Minh Campaign" that saw Saigon fall on 30 April 1975.

Price controls and rationing

United States

Price controls exacerbated the crisis in the US. The system limited the price of "old oil" (that which had already been discovered) while allowing newly discovered oil to be sold at a higher price to encourage investment. Predictably, old oil was withdrawn from the market, creating greater scarcity. The rule also discouraged development of alternative energies. The rule had been intended to promote oil exploration. Scarcity was addressed by rationing (as in many countries). Motorists faced long lines at gas stations beginning in summer 1972 and increasing by summer 1973.

In 1973, Nixon named William E. Simon as the first Administrator of the Federal Energy Office, a short-term organization created to coordinate the response to the embargo. Simon allocated states the same amount of domestic oil for 1974 that each had consumed in 1972, which worked for states whose populations were not increasing. In other states, lines at gasoline stations were common. The American Automobile Association reported that in the last week of February 1974, 20% of American gasoline stations had no fuel.

Odd–even rationing allowed vehicles with license plates having an odd number as the last digit (or a vanity license plate) to buy gas only on odd-numbered days of the month, while others could buy only on even-numbered days.

In some states, a three-color flag system was used to denote gasoline availability at service stations—green for unrationed availability, yellow for restricted/rationed sales and red for out of stock.

Rationing led to violent incidents, when truck drivers chose to strike for two days in December 1973 over the limited supplies that Simon had allocated for their industry. In Pennsylvania and Ohio, non-striking truckers were shot at by striking truckers, and in Arkansas, trucks of non-strikers were attacked with bombs.

America had controlled the price of natural gas since the 1950s. With the inflation of the 1970s, the price was too low to encourage the search for new reserves. America's natural gas reserves dwindled from 237 trillion in 1974 to 203 trillion in 1978. The price controls were not changed, despite president Gerald Ford's repeated requests to Congress.

Conservation and reduction in demand

United States
To help reduce consumption, in 1974 a national maximum speed limit of 55 mph (89 km/h) was imposed through the Emergency Highway Energy Conservation Act. Development of the Strategic Petroleum Reserve began in 1975, and in 1977 the cabinet-level Department of Energy was created, followed by the National Energy Act of 1978. On November 28, 1995, President Bill Clinton signed the National Highway Designation Act, ending the federal 55 mph speed limit which allowed states to restore their prior maximum speed limit. Year-round daylight saving time was implemented from January 6, 1974, to October 27, 1975, with a break between October 27, 1974, and February 23, 1975, when the country observed standard time. Parents complained that it forced many children to travel to school before sunrise. The prior rules were restored in 1976.

The crisis prompted a call to conserve energy, most notably a campaign by the Advertising Council using the tagline "Don't Be Fuelish". Many newspapers carried advertisements featuring cut-outs that could be attached to light switches, reading "Last Out, Lights Out: Don't Be Fuelish".

Although not regulated by the new legislation, auto racing groups voluntarily began conserving. In 1974, NASCAR reduced all race distances by 10%; the 24 Hours of Daytona and the 12 Hours of Sebring race were cancelled.

In 1975, the Energy Policy and Conservation Act was passed, leading to the creation of the Corporate Average Fuel Economy (CAFE) standards that required improved fuel economy for cars and light trucks.

In 1976, Congress created the Weatherization Assistance Program to help low-income homeowners and renters reduce their demand for heating and cooling through better insulation.

By 1980, domestic luxury cars with a  wheelbase and gross weights averaging 4,500 pounds (2,041 kg) were no longer made. The automakers had begun phasing out the traditional front engine/rear-wheel drive layout in compact cars in favor of lighter front engine/front-wheel drive designs. A higher percentage of cars offered more efficient four-cylinder engines. Domestic auto makers also began offering more fuel efficient diesel powered passenger cars as well.

Alternative energy sources

The energy crisis led to greater interest in renewable energy, nuclear power and domestic fossil fuels. According to Peter Grossman, American energy policies since the crisis have been dominated by crisis-mentality thinking, promoting expensive quick fixes and single-shot solutions that ignore market and technology realities. He wrote that instead of providing stable rules that support basic research while leaving plenty of scope for entrepreneurship and innovation, Congresses and presidents have repeatedly backed policies which promise solutions that are politically expedient, but whose prospects are doubtful.

The Brazilian government implemented its "Proálcool" (pro-alcohol) project in 1975 that mixed ethanol with gasoline for automotive fuel.

Israel was one of the few countries unaffected by the embargo, since it could extract sufficient oil from the Sinai. But to supplement Israel's over-taxed power grid, Harry Zvi Tabor, the father of Israel's solar industry, developed the prototype for a solar water heater now used in over 90% of Israeli homes.

Macroeconomy
Western central banks decided to sharply cut interest rates to encourage growth, deciding that inflation was a secondary concern. Although this was the orthodox macroeconomic prescription at the time, the resulting stagflation surprised economists and central bankers. The policy is now considered by some to have deepened and lengthened the adverse effects of the embargo. Recent research claims that in the period after 1985 the economy became more resilient to energy price increases.

The price shock created large current account deficits in oil-importing economies. A petrodollar recycling mechanism was created, through which OPEC surplus funds were channeled through the capital markets to the West to finance the current account deficits. The functioning of this mechanism required the relaxation of capital controls in oil-importing economies. It marked the beginning of an exponential growth of Western capital markets.

In the United States in 1974, seven of the 15 top Fortune 500 companies were oil companies, falling to four in 2014.

International relations
The crisis had a major impact on international relations and created a rift within NATO. Some European nations and Japan sought to disassociate themselves from United States foreign policy in the Middle East to avoid being targeted by the boycott. Arab oil producers linked any future policy changes to peace between the belligerents. To address this, the Nixon Administration began multilateral negotiations with the combatants. They arranged for Israel to pull back from the Sinai Peninsula and the Golan Heights. By January 18, 1974, US Secretary of State Henry Kissinger had negotiated an Israeli troop withdrawal from parts of the Sinai Peninsula. The promise of a negotiated settlement between Israel and Syria was enough to convince Arab oil producers to lift the embargo in March 1974. and again during the 1979 energy crisis.

United States
America's Cold War policies suffered a major blow from the embargo. They had focused on China and the Soviet Union, but the latent challenge to US hegemony coming from the Third World became evident.

In 2004, declassified documents revealed that the US was so distraught by the rise in oil prices and being challenged by under-developed countries that they briefly considered military action to forcibly seize Middle Eastern oilfields in late 1973. Although no explicit plan was mentioned, a conversation between U.S. Secretary of Defense James Schlesinger and British Ambassador to the United States Lord Cromer revealed Schlesinger had told him that "it was no longer obvious to him that the U.S. could not use force." British Prime Minister Edward Heath was so worried by this prospect that he ordered a British intelligence estimate of US intentions, which concluded that America "might consider it could not tolerate a situation in which the U.S. and its allies were at the mercy of a small group of unreasonable countries", and that they would prefer a rapid operation to seize oilfields in Saudi Arabia and Kuwait, and possibly Abu Dhabi if military action was decided upon. Although the Soviet response to such an act would likely not involve force, intelligence warned "the American occupation would need to last 10 years as the West developed alternative energy sources, and would result in the 'total alienation' of the Arabs and much of the rest of the Third World."

NATO
Western Europe began switching from pro-Israel to more pro-Arab policies. This change strained the Western alliance. The US, which imported only 12% of its oil from the Middle East (compared with 80% for the Europeans and over 90% for Japan), remained staunchly committed to Israel. The percentage of US oil which comes from the nations bordering the Persian Gulf remained steady over the decades, with a figure of a little more than 10% in 2008.

With the embargo in place, many developed countries altered their policies regarding the Arab-Israeli conflict. These included the UK, which refused to allow the United States to use British bases and Cyprus to airlift resupplies to Israel, along with the rest of the members of the European Community.

Canada shifted towards a more pro-Arab position after displeasure was expressed towards Canada's mostly neutral position. "On the other hand, after the embargo the Canadian government moved quickly indeed toward the Arab position, despite its low dependence on Middle Eastern oil".

Japan
Although lacking historical connections to the Middle East, Japan was the country most dependent on Arab oil. 71% of its imported oil came from the Middle East in 1970. On November 7, 1973, the Saudi and Kuwaiti governments declared Japan a "nonfriendly" country to encourage it to change its noninvolvement policy. It received a 5% production cut in December, causing a panic. On November 22, Japan issued a statement "asserting that Israel should withdraw from all of the 1967 territories, advocating Palestinian self-determination, and threatening to reconsider its policy toward Israel if Israel refused to accept these preconditions". By December 25, Japan was considered an Arab-friendly state.

Nonaligned nations
The oil embargo was announced roughly one month after a right-wing military coup in Chile led by General Augusto Pinochet toppled socialist president Salvador Allende on September 11, 1973. The response of the Nixon administration was to propose doubling arms sales. As a consequence, an opposing Latin American bloc was organized and financed in part by Venezuelan oil revenues, which quadrupled between 1970 and 1975.

A year after the start of the embargo, the UN's nonaligned bloc passed a resolution demanding the creation of a "New International Economic Order" under which nations within the global South would receive a greater share of benefits derived from the exploitation of southern resources and greater control over their self-development.

Arab states
Prior to the embargo, the geo-political competition between the Soviet Union and the United States, in combination with low oil prices that hindered the necessity and feasibility of alternative energy sources, presented the Arab States with financial security, moderate economic growth, and disproportionate international bargaining power.

The oil shock disrupted the status quo relationships between Arab countries and the US and USSR. At the time, Egypt, Syria and Iraq were allied with the USSR, while Saudi Arabia, Turkey and Iran (plus Israel) aligned with the US. Vacillations in alignment often resulted in greater support from the respective superpowers. When Anwar Sadat became president of Egypt in 1970, he dismissed Soviet specialists in Egypt and reoriented towards the US.

Concerns over economic domination from increased Soviet oil production turned into fears of military aggression after the 1979 Soviet invasion of Afghanistan—a major turning point in Cold War geopolitics -, turning the Persian Gulf states towards the US for security guarantees against Soviet military action, also coming at a time marked by increased American weapons sales, technology, and outright military presence to various US-allied nations. Saudi Arabia and Iran became increasingly dependent on American security assurances to manage both external and internal threats, including increased military competition between them over increased oil revenues. Both states were competing for preeminence in the Persian Gulf and using increased revenues to fund expanded militaries. By 1979, Saudi arms purchases from the US exceeded five times Israel's.

In the wake of the 1979 Iranian Revolution the Saudis were forced to deal with the prospect of internal destabilization via the radicalism of Islamism, a reality which would quickly be revealed in the Grand Mosque seizure in Mecca by Wahhabi extremists during November 1979, and a Shiite Muslim revolt in the oil rich Al-Hasa region of Saudi Arabia in December of the same year, which was known as the 1979 Qatif Uprising. Saudi Arabia is a near-absolute monarchy, an Arabic speaking country, and has a Sunni Muslim majority, while Persian speaking Iran since 1979 is an Islamist theocracy with a Shiite Muslim majority, which explains the current hostility between Saudi Arabia and Iran.

Before the Iranian Revolution the usually pro-American, anti-Communist and largely Sunni Muslim Saudi Arabians were somewhat wary of the pro-Soviet relations held by the Ba'athist socialist and relatively secularist republican dictatorship of Iraq, the latter of which is a majority Shiite Muslim Arab nation which was ruled by a Sunni Muslim Arab minority before the Iraq War, and how that affected the Saudis' own relations with the Iraqis, because these two oil-rich Arab nations share a long land border with each other.

Automobile industry

The oil crisis sent a signal to the auto industry globally, which changed many aspects of production and usage for decades to come.

Western Europe
After World War II, most West European countries taxed motor fuel to limit imports, and as a result most cars made in Europe were smaller and more economical than their American counterparts. By the late 1960s, increasing incomes supported rising car sizes.

The oil crisis pushed West European car buyers away from larger, less economical cars. The most notable result of this transition was the rise in popularity of compact hatchbacks. The only notable small hatchbacks built in Western Europe before the oil crisis were the Peugeot 104, Renault 5 and Fiat 127. By the end of the decade, the market had expanded with the introduction of the Ford Fiesta, Opel Kadett (sold as the Vauxhall Astra in Great Britain), Chrysler Sunbeam and Citroën Visa.

Buyers looking for larger cars were increasingly drawn to medium-sized hatchbacks. Virtually unknown in Europe in 1973, by the end of the decade they were gradually replacing sedans as the mainstay of this sector. Between 1973 and 1980, medium-sized hatchbacks were launched across Europe: the Chrysler/Simca Horizon, Fiat Ritmo (Strada in the UK), Ford Escort MK3, Renault 14, Volvo 340 / 360, Opel Kadett, and Volkswagen Golf.

These cars were considerably more economical than the traditional saloons they were replacing, and attracted buyers who traditionally bought larger vehicles. Some 15 years after the oil crisis, hatchbacks dominated most European small and medium car markets, and had gained a substantial share of the large family car market.

United States

Before the energy crisis, large, heavy, and powerful cars were popular. By 1971, the standard engine in a Chevrolet Caprice was a 400-cubic inch (6.5 liter) V8. In the 15 years prior to the 1973 oil crisis, gasoline prices in the U.S. had lagged well behind inflation.

The crisis reduced the demand for large cars. Japanese imports, primarily the Toyota Corona, the Toyota Corolla, the Datsun B210, the Datsun 510, the Honda Civic, the Mitsubishi Galant (a captive import from Chrysler sold as the Dodge Colt), the Subaru DL, and later the Honda Accord all had four cylinder engines that were more fuel efficient than the typical American V8 and six cylinder engines. Japanese imports became mass-market leaders with unibody construction and front-wheel drive, which became de facto standards.

From Europe, the Volkswagen Beetle, the Volkswagen Fastback, the Renault 8, the Renault LeCar, and the Fiat Brava were successful. Detroit responded with the Ford Pinto, the Ford Maverick, the Chevrolet Vega, the Chevrolet Nova, the Plymouth Valiant and the Plymouth Volaré. American Motors sold its homegrown Gremlin, Hornet and Pacer models.

Some buyers lamented the small size of the first Japanese compacts, and both Toyota and Nissan (then known as Datsun) introduced larger cars such as the Toyota Corona Mark II, the Toyota Cressida, the Mazda 616 and Datsun 810, which added passenger space and amenities such as air conditioning, power steering, AM-FM radios, and even power windows and central locking without increasing the price of the vehicle. A decade after the 1973 oil crisis, Honda, Toyota and Nissan, affected by the 1981 voluntary export restraints, opened US assembly plants and established their luxury divisions (Acura, Lexus and Infiniti, respectively) to distinguish themselves from their mass-market brands.

Compact trucks were introduced, such as the Toyota Hilux and the Datsun Truck, followed by the Mazda Truck (sold as the Ford Courier), and the Isuzu-built Chevrolet LUV. Mitsubishi rebranded its Forte as the Dodge D-50 a few years after the oil crisis. Mazda, Mitsubishi and Isuzu had joint partnerships with Ford, Chrysler, and GM, respectively. Later, the American makers introduced their domestic replacements (Ford Ranger, Dodge Dakota and the Chevrolet S10/GMC S-15), ending their captive import policy.

An increase in imported cars into North America forced General Motors, Ford and Chrysler to introduce smaller and fuel-efficient models for domestic sales. The Dodge Omni / Plymouth Horizon from Chrysler, the Ford Fiesta and the Chevrolet Chevette all had four-cylinder engines and room for at least four passengers by the late 1970s. By 1985, the average American vehicle moved 17.4 miles per gallon, compared to 13.5 in 1970. The improvements stayed, even though the price of a barrel of oil remained constant at $12 from 1974 to 1979.
Sales of large sedans for most makes (except Chrysler products) recovered within two model years of the 1973 crisis. The Cadillac DeVille and Fleetwood, Buick Electra, Oldsmobile 98, Lincoln Continental, Mercury Marquis, and various other luxury oriented sedans became popular again in the mid-1970s. The only full-size models that did not recover were lower price models such as the Chevrolet Bel Air and Ford Galaxie 500. Slightly smaller models such as the Oldsmobile Cutlass, Chevrolet Monte Carlo, Ford Thunderbird and various others sold well.

Economical imports succeeded alongside heavy, expensive vehicles. In 1976, Toyota sold 346,920 cars (average weight around 2,100 lbs), while Cadillac sold 309,139 cars (average weight around 5,000 lbs).

Federal safety standards, such as NHTSA Federal Motor Vehicle Safety Standard 215 (pertaining to safety bumpers), and compacts like the 1974 Mustang I were a prelude to the DOT "downsize" revision of vehicle categories. By 1977, GM's full-sized cars reflected the crisis. By 1979, virtually all "full-size" American cars had shrunk, featuring smaller engines and smaller outside dimensions. Chrysler ended production of their full-sized luxury sedans at the end of the 1981 model year, moving instead to a full front-wheel drive lineup for 1982 (except for the M-body Dodge Diplomat/Plymouth Gran Fury and Chrysler New Yorker Fifth Avenue sedans).

Consequences

Decline of OPEC

OPEC soon lost its preeminent position, and in 1981, its production was surpassed by that of other countries. Additionally, its own member nations were divided. Saudi Arabia, trying to recover market share, increased production, pushing prices down, shrinking or eliminating profits for high-cost producers. The world price, which had peaked during the 1979 energy crisis at nearly $40 per barrel, decreased during the 1980s to less than $10 per barrel. Adjusted for inflation, oil briefly fell back to pre-1973 levels. This "sale" price was a windfall for oil-importing nations, both developing and developed.

During the Iran-Iraq war of 1980–1988, the stated war aim of Iran was to overthrow the Baath regime in Iraq and then overthrow the House of Saud in Saudi Arabia. As a consequence, Saudi Arabia and the other Arab Gulf states leaned in a very pro-Iraqi neutrality during the war. As a part of its policy of supporting Iraq, Saudi Arabia pumped out oil in massive quantities to lower the price as a way of hurting Iran's economy. The low price of oil also hurt Iraq's economy, which forced Iraq to borrow massive sums of money, putting Iraq deeply into debt; by contrast, Iran refused to borrow any money because of its refusal to pay interest on any loans and paid the costs of the war direct from the sale of its oil. Iran's revenue from the sale of oil went from $20 billion US dollars per year in 1982 to $5 billion US dollars per year by 1988, which pushed Iran to the verge of bankruptcy and forced Iran to finally make peace with Iraq later in 1988. During the war, the Iranian delegation at OPEC tried very hard to have the group cut production to raise prices, but were blocked by the other delegations led by the Saudi delegation, who insisted on more oil production.

Oil sources diversification
The embargo encouraged new venues for energy exploration, including Alaska, the North Sea, the Caspian Sea, and the Caucasus. Exploration in the Caspian Basin and Siberia became profitable. Cooperation changed into a far more adversarial relationship as the USSR increased its production. By 1980, the Soviet Union had become the world's largest producer.

Part of the decline in prices and economic and geopolitical power of OPEC came from the move to alternative energy sources. OPEC had relied on price inelasticity to maintain high consumption, but had underestimated the extent to which conservation and other sources of supply would eventually reduce demand. Electricity generation from nuclear power and natural gas, home heating from natural gas, and ethanol-blended gasoline all reduced the demand for oil.

Economic impact
The drop in prices presented a serious problem for oil-exporting countries in northern Europe and the Persian Gulf. Heavily populated, impoverished countries, whose economies were largely dependent on oil—including Mexico, Nigeria, Algeria, and Libya—did not prepare for a market reversal that left them in sometimes desperate situations.

When reduced demand and increased production glutted the world market in the mid-1980s, oil prices plummeted and the cartel lost its unity. Mexico (a non-member), Nigeria, and Venezuela, whose economies had expanded in the 1970s, faced near-bankruptcy, and even Saudi Arabian economic power was significantly weakened. The divisions within OPEC made concerted action more difficult. , OPEC has never approached its earlier dominance.

Graphs and charts

See also

1967 Oil Embargo
1970s energy crisis
1970s commodities boom
1990 oil price shock
2000s energy crisis
2022 global energy crisis 
Hubbert peak theory
Supply shock
Petrodollar recycling
"Energy Crisis '74"

References

Bibliography
 
 Blinder, Alan S. (1979). Economic Policy and the Great Stagflation. New York: Academic Press.
 Bromley, Simon. (1991). American Hegemony and World Oil: The Industry, the State System, and the World Economy (Pennsylvania State UP)

 Eckstein, Otto (1979). The Great Recession. Amsterdam: North-Holland.
 
 
 Johnson, Ronald A. "The impact of rising oil prices on the major foreign industrial countries." Federal Reserve Bulletin 66 (1980): 817–824.

 
 Lesch, David W. 1979: The Year That Shaped The Modern Middle East (2019) excerpt

 
 

 Odell, Peter R. Oil and gas: crises and controversies 1961–2000 (2001) online
 Odell, Peter R. Oil and world power : background to the oil crisis (1974) online
 Painter, David S. (2014) "Oil and geopolitics: The oil crises of the 1970s and the cold war." Historical Social Research/Historische Sozialforschung (2014): 186–208. online
 Randall, Stephen J. United States foreign oil policy since World War I: For profits and security (Montreal: McGill-Queen's Press-MQUP, 2005).
 Rybczynski, T.M. ed. The Economics of the Oil Crisis (Palgrave Macmillan, 1976)
 Sobel, Lester A. "Energy crisis, 1969–1973. Volume I. (Facts on File, 1974). online
 Stern, Roger J. (2016) "Oil Scarcity Ideology in US Foreign Policy, 1908–97." Security Studies 25.2 (2016): 214–257. online
 Venn, Fiona. The oil crisis (Routledge, 2016). excerpt
 Venn, Fiona. Oil Diplomacy in the Twentieth Century (Palgrave, 1986) online
  online; very detailed coverage

Primary sources
 Kissinger, Henry. Years of Upheaval (1982).

External links

 Hakes, Jay (2008). 35 Years After the Arab Oil Embargo, Journal of Energy Security.
 Morgan, Oliver; Islam, Faisal (2001). Saudi dove in the oil slick, The Guardian. Sheikh Ahmed Zaki Yamani, former oil minister of Saudi Arabia, gives his personal account of the 1973 energy crisis.
 Oppenheim, V.H. (1976). Why Oil Prices Go Up: The Past: We Pushed Them, Foreign Policy''.
 US Energy Information Administration (1998). 25th Anniversary of the 1973 Oil Embargo

Oil Crisis, 1973
Oil Crisis
Arab–Israeli conflict
Embargoes
Gold standard
History of the petroleum industry
Inflation
Natural resource conflicts
Peak oil
Petroleum economics
Petroleum politics
Presidency of Richard Nixon
Scarcity
Energy crises